The Britannia Staff Union was a trade union in the United Kingdom.

The union was founded in 1972 as the Leek and Westbourne Building Society Staff Association, and was certified as an independent union in 1976.  In 1984, it was renamed the Britannia Building Society Staff Association, becoming the Britannia Staff Union in 1994.  In 1999, it affiliated to the Trades Union Congress.  The union organised workers at the Britannia division of The Co-operative Bank, where it had a high membership density - 76% in 2004.

In July 2018, the union merged into Unite.

References

Trade unions established in 1972
Trade unions disestablished in 2018
Trade unions in the United Kingdom
1972 establishments in the United Kingdom
Trade unions based in Staffordshire
Finance sector trade unions